Enrico "Henry" Tameleo (died 1985), also known as "The Referee", was an American mobster from Boston, Massachusetts and underboss in the New England-based Patriarca crime family and was also a member of the New York-based Bonanno crime family of La Cosa Nostra from 1952 to 1968.

Criminal career

Tameleo was a long time participant in organized crime and is considered one of the founding fathers of the Patriarca family. In 1967, Tameleo, Raymond L.S. Patriarca, and Jerry Angiulo were charged with the murder of bookmaker Willie Marfeo. Before the trial's conclusion, on March 12, 1965, Tameleo, Peter Limone, Louis Greco, Wilfred Roy French, Ronald Cassesso and Joe Salvati were indicted for the murder of hoodlum Edward "Teddy" Deegan. In 1968, all six men were found guilty of the Deegan murder in the Superior Court of Suffolk County, Massachusetts. Tameleo, Limone, Greco and Cassesso were sentenced to death by the state, with Salvati and French receiving life sentences. The death sentences were later reduced to life in prison, where Tameleo died in 1985.

Wrongful conviction
By 2000, Tameleo and the other defendants had been posthumously exonerated amid evidence they had been ensnared in a government frame-up and cover-up extending over thirty years. In 2007, a federal judge in Boston awarded damages of $101.7 million to the families of the four men who were wrongly convicted in the 1965 Deegan murder.  It was proven that Federal Bureau of Investigation (FBI) agents H. Paul Rico, Dennis Condon, John Morris, and John Connolly withheld evidence of the defendants' innocence in order to protect FBI informants Vincent "Jimmy the Bear" Flemmi and Joseph Barboza. Out of this settlement, $13 million went to the estate of Enrico Tameleo, specifically his son, Saverio, as administrator of the Tameleo estate, and Tameleo's wife Jeanette.

Notes

See also
 Patriarca crime family
 Winter Hill Gang

1985 deaths
People from Boston
American gangsters of Italian descent
Patriarca crime family
American people who died in prison custody
Prisoners who died in Massachusetts detention
American prisoners sentenced to death
Prisoners sentenced to death by Massachusetts
American people convicted of murder
People convicted of murder by Massachusetts
Wrongful convictions
Year of birth unknown